Acceptcard Pro Cycling, also known as Team Acceptcard was a Danish professional road bicycle racing team in 1998 and 1999. The sponsor, is a Danish credit card company.

It was considered Denmark's first professional cycling team, and was managed by Henrik Elmgreen and Brian Holm. The team disbanded after the 1999 season due to failing to acquire a new main sponsor after AcceptCard ended their sponsorship.

Brian Holm was on the team in 1998, and manager in 1999. Jakob Piil rode for the team both years.

The team had three victories in 1998 and ten in 1999.

References

External links 
 Elmic's fan page

Defunct cycling teams based in Denmark
Cycling teams based in Denmark
Cycling teams established in 1998
Cycling teams disestablished in 1999